is a trans-Neptunian object that orbits the Sun in the Kuiper belt beyond Neptune. This TNO briefly garnered scientific attention when it was found to have an unexpectedly low density of about 0.82 g/cm3.

 has an absolute magnitude of about 4.0, and Spitzer Space Telescope results estimate it to be about 681 km in diameter. 
The low density of this and many other mid sized TNOs implies that they have likely never compressed into fully solid bodies, let alone differentiated or collapsed into hydrostatic equilibrium, and so are highly unlikely to be dwarf planets.

It was discovered on 30 October 2002, by the Spacewatch program.

Numbering and naming 

This minor planet was numbered (55637) by the Minor Planet Center on 16 February 2003. , it has not been named.

Classification 

 has a perihelion of 36.7 AU, which it will next reach in 2065. As of 2020,  is 40 AU from the Sun.

The Minor Planet Center classifies  as a cubewano while the Deep Ecliptic Survey (DES) classifies it as scattered-extended. The DES using a 10 My integration (last observation: 2009-10-22) shows it with a minimum perihelion (qmin) distance of 36.3 AU.

It has been observed 212 times with precovery images dating back to 1991.

Physical characteristics 

A variability of the visual brightness was detected which could be fit to a period of 14.38 or 16.78 h (depending on a single-peaked or double peaked curve). The light-curve amplitude is ΔM = .

Assuming equal albedos for the primary and secondary it leads to the size estimates of ~664 km and ~190 km, respectively. If the albedo of the secondary is half of that of the primary the estimates become ~640 and ~260 km, respectively. Using an improved thermophysical model slightly different sizes were obtained for UX25 and its satellite: 659 km and 230 km, respectively.

 has red featureless spectrum in the visible and near-infrared but has a negative slope in the K-band, which may indicate the presence of the methanol compounds on the surface. It is redder than Varuna, unlike its neutral-colored "twin" , in spite of similar brightness and orbital elements.

Composition 

With a density of 0.82 g/cm3, assuming that the primary and satellite have the same density,  is one of the largest known solid objects in the Solar System that is less dense than water. Why this should be is not well understood, because objects of its size in the Kuiper belt often contain a fair amount of rock and are hence pretty dense. To have a similar composition to others large KBOs, it would have to be exceptionally porous, which was believed to be unlikely given the compactability of water ice; this low density thus astonished astronomers.

Satellite 

The discovery of a minor-planet moon was reported in IAUC 8812 on 22 February 2007. The satellite was detected using the Hubble Space Telescope in August 2005. The satellite was found at 0.16 arcsec from the primary with an apparent magnitude difference of 2.5.

This moon is estimated to be  in diameter. Assuming the same albedo as the primary, it would have a diameter of 190 km, assuming an albedo of 0.05 (typical of other cold, classical KBOs of similar size) a diameter of 260 km.

References

External links 
 MPEC 2002-V08
 Astronomers surprised by large space rock less dense than water, Ron Cowen, Nature, 13 November 2013
 Scientist finds medium sized Kuiper belt object less dense than water, Bob Yirka, Phys.org, 14 November 2013
 
 

Classical Kuiper belt objects
Discoveries by the Spacewatch project
Possible dwarf planets
Binary trans-Neptunian objects
20021030